Glen View South is a constituency of the National Assembly of the Parliament of Zimbabwe, comprising the southern portion of the Glen View suburb of Harare. Its current MP since a 7 September 2019 by-election is Vincent Tsvangirai of the MDC Alliance, son of the late opposition leader Morgan Tsvangirai. He replaced his sister, Vimbai Tsvangirai-Java, who died on 10 June 2019.

Members

References 

Harare
Parliamentary constituencies in Zimbabwe